The Funny Manns is an American syndicated television program that first appeared in 1961. It was hosted by Cliff Norton and featured re-edited public domain silent movies, much as Jay Ward's show Fractured Flickers did. There are 130 black & white episodes produced for NBC. The show was co-produced by Nick Nicholson, who sometimes performed on the show's skits with Norton. It was broadcast by the BBC in the United Kingdom.

The program would always begin with Cliff Norton as some type of handyman, whether it was a painter, repairman, or even a plumber, and as he began dialog, he would use the lines "I learned everything I know from my (Uncle/Father/etc.)," and "Alright, who's the funny man?" Then, it would cut to the edited silent films.

The silent stars appearing on the show included Snub Pollard, Poodles Hanneford, Billy Bevan, Oliver Hardy (minus his partner, Stan Laurel) and a young Mickey Rooney, billed as "Mickey McGuire".

1960s American satirical television series
1961 American television series debuts
Television series by CBS Studios
First-run syndicated television programs in the United States
American parody television series
Year of television series ending missing